The Billboard Top Latin albums chart, published in Billboard magazine, is a record chart that features Latin music sales information. This data are compiled by Nielsen SoundScan from a sample that includes music stores, music departments at electronics and department stores, Internet sales (both physical and digital) and verifiable sales from concert venues in the United States.

Albums

References

2009 Latin
United States Latin Albums
2009 in Latin music